Shahrak-e Hashemiyeh (also Romanized as Shahrak-e Hāshemīyeh; also known as Hāshemīyeh) is a village in Paskuh Rural District, Sedeh District, Qaen County, South Khorasan Province, Iran. At the 2006 census, its population was 1,211, in 259 families.

References 

Populated places in Qaen County